The Tri-State Conference was an intercollegiate athletic conference associated with National Association of Intercollegiate Athletics (NAIA) the that existed from 1960 to 1981 and one of two conferences to share this name. The league had members in the Midwestern states of Iowa, Nebraska, South Dakota, and Minnesota.

The Tri-State Conference began operations in 1960 with seven members: Concordia College (now known as Concordia University Nebraska in Seward, Nebraska), Dana College in Blair, Nebraska, Midland College (now known as Midland University) in Fremont, Nebraska, Northwestern College in Orange City, Iowa, Sioux Falls College (now known as the University of Sioux Falls) in Sioux Falls, South Dakota, Westmar University in Le Mars, Iowa, and Yankton College in Yankton, South Dakota. In 1971, the three Nebraska schools (Concordia, Dana, and Midland) withdrew; they joined the Nebraska Intercollegiate Athletic Conference (now known as the Great Plains Athletic Conference) in 1969 and had been members of both conferences. The same year, 1971, Bethel College (now known as Bethel University) in Arden Hills, Minnesota and Concordia University in Saint Paul, Minnesota joined the Tri-State Conference. Concordia of St. Paul left in 1975 as did Bethel in 1977. Dordt College (now known as Dordt University) joined in 1976. Sioux Falls left in 1977 to join the South Dakota Intercollegiate Conference.

Football champions

 1960 – 
 1961 – 
 1962 –  and 
 1963 – 
 1964 – 
 1965 –  and 
 1966 –  and 
 1967 – 
 1968 – Westmar
 1969 – 
 1970 – 

 1971 – 
 1972 – 
 1973 – Northwestern (IA)
 1974 – 
 1976 – 
 1977 – 
 1978 – 
 1979 – 
 1980 –

See also
 List of defunct college football conferences

References

 
College sports in Iowa
College sports in Nebraska
College sports in South Dakota